Jan Bystroń may refer to:
 Jan Bystroń (linguist) (1860–1902), Polish linguist
 Jan Stanisław Bystroń (1892–1964), his son, Polish sociologist and ethnographer